Bijaya Kumar Sahoo ( June 1, 1963 – June 3, 2021) was an Indian educationalist and businessman from Bhubaneswar, Odisha. He was the founder and chairman of SAI International School, Bhubaneswar,  SAI Angan, and SAI International Residential School. Indian Institute of Management Calcutta (IIM Calcutta) has published a case study on the life of Bijaya Kumar Sahoo, Founder-Chairman SAI International. He was appointed as the Advisor cum Working President of Odisha Adarsha Vidyalaya, Department of School and Mass Education, Government of Odisha on 24 June 2019 by Chief Minister of Odisha.
He founded the JSS group which established first private STP (Software Technology Park)in Odisha.

References 

1963 births
2021 deaths